Sir Henry Lumley Drayton  (April 27, 1869 – August 28, 1950) was a Canadian lawyer and politician.

Early life 

Born in Kingston, Ontario, the son of Philip Henry Drayton, who came to Canada with the 16th Rifles of England, and Margaret S. Covernton, Drayton was educated in the schools of England and Canada. He was called to the Ontario Bar in 1891 and was created a King's Counsel in 1908.

Legal career 

From 1893 to 1900, Drayton was an Assistant City Solicitor for Toronto. In 1900, he formed a partnership with Charles J. Holman. In 1902, he was appointed Counsel to the Railway Committee of the Ontario Legislature. From 1904 to 1909, he was a County Crown Attorney for the County of York. In 1910, he was appointed Counsel for the Corporation of the City of Toronto. In 1911, he was appointed to the Toronto Power Commission. In 1912, he was appointed Chief Commissioner of the Board of Railway Commissioners for Canada.

Political career 

Drayton was first elected to the House of Commons of Canada from Kingston in a 1919 by-election as a Conservative Party candidate. He served as Minister of Finance under both Sir Robert Borden and Arthur Meighen until the Conservative Party's defeat in the 1921 general election. Drayton kept his seat in that election.

In 1927, he was a candidate the leadership of the Conservative Party, but finished in last place. Drayton retired from politics in 1928 to become chairman of the Liquor Control Board of Ontario.

He attempted to return to Parliament in the 1945 election from a seat in Victoria, British Columbia, but lost narrowly to the Liberal candidate.

Personal life and death 

Drayton married Edith Mary Cawthra and had three daughters. He died on August 28, 1950, at the age of 81.

Electoral history

References 
 

1869 births
1950 deaths
Canadian Knights Bachelor
Canadian Ministers of Finance
Canadian Ministers of Railways and Canals
Canadian people of English descent
Conservative Party of Canada (1867–1942) MPs
Members of the House of Commons of Canada from Ontario
Members of the King's Privy Council for Canada
People from Kingston, Ontario
Canadian King's Counsel